The Wynne Post Office is located at 402 East Merriman Street in Wynne, Arkansas.  It is a single story brick structure, with a built-up parapet obscuring a flat roof.  A recent addition extends to the rear.  The building was built in 1936 at a cost to the federal government of $65,000.  It is most notable for the mural that adorns its main lobby, titled "Cotton Pickers", which was created by Ethel Magafan with funding from the United States Treasury Department's Section of Art, a Depression-era jobs program for artists.

The building was listed on the National Register of Historic Places in 1998.

See also 

National Register of Historic Places listings in Cross County, Arkansas
List of United States post offices

References

External links

Post office buildings on the National Register of Historic Places in Arkansas
Art Deco architecture in Arkansas
Government buildings completed in 1936
Buildings and structures in Cross County, Arkansas
National Register of Historic Places in Cross County, Arkansas